The Minister for Social Exclusion was a ministerial position within the cabinet of the British government.  It was first created as a position outside the cabinet by Tony Blair in 1999 and charged with "tackling social exclusion". From May 2006 until June 2007 it was a full cabinet position in order to put such issues at the forefront of the government's agenda. However, since the Premiership of Gordon Brown, it is no longer a position in Government and as such has become redundant.

The last minister was Hilary Armstrong.

List of Ministers

References

Defunct ministerial offices in the United Kingdom